The first official currency of Brazil was the real (pronounced ; pl. réis), with the symbol Rs$. As the currency of the Portuguese empire, it was in use in Brazil from the earliest days of the colonial period, and remained in use until 1942, when it was replaced by the cruzeiro.

The name "real" was resurrected in 1994 for the new currency unit (but with the new plural form "reais"). This currency is still in use. One modern real is equivalent to 2.75 × 1018 (2.75 quintillion) of the old réis.

The name comes from the Portuguese word real (in the sense of "royal" or "regal") and was borrowed from a Portuguese currency previously used in Brazil.

The dollar-like sign in the currency's symbol (and in the symbols of all other Brazilian currencies), called cifrão in Portuguese, was always written with two vertical strokes rather than one.

History
The Portuguese real was the currency used by the first Portuguese settlers to arrive in the Americas, but the first official money to circulate bearing the name real was actually printed in 1654 by the Dutch, during their occupation of part of the Brazilian Northeast.

The values of both units diverged further in the 19th century, with the  becoming 8,000 Portuguese  in 1837 versus 16,000 Brazilian  in 1846.

The real was retained when Brazil became independent in 1822. It was not sub-divided in smaller units, and was affected by significant inflation during its long lifespan.

Amounts under 1,000  were typically written prefixed by "Rs", as in "Rs 350". For amounts of one million  and over, a colon ":" was also inserted just after the millions digit, as in "Rs " for 1,020,800 .

In the 18th century and early 19th centuries, the gold currency was based on the 22 karat gold  which weighed  ounce (14.34 grams). The standard for the silver currency varied during this period, with the 640 real coin fixed at   (17.92 grams) of .917 silver in 1806. In 1846, a gold standard was established with the  set at 822.076 mg gold, a 37.5% debasement from the previous standard.

After the establishment of the Republic in 1889, the value of the currency fell, with a peg of 180 mg of gold for the one thousand  set in 1926. A further devaluation occurred in 1939, when it was pegged to the U.S. dollar at a rate of   = US$1.

Coins 

In the 1750s, copper coins were in circulation in denominations of 5, 10, 20 and 40 réis, silver coins for 75, 150, 300 and 600 réis, and gold coins for 1,000, 2,000, 4,000 and 6,400 réis. The silver coinage was reformed in 1778, with the introduction of 80, 160, 320 and 640 real coins. Between 1780 and 1782, gold 800, 1,600 and 3,200 réis were added. In 1809, older copper and silver coins were counterstamped with the Portuguese arms, doubling the value of 5, 10, 20 and 40 real pieces and increasing the value of 75, 150, 300 and 600 real coins to 80, 160, 320 and 640 réis. From 1810, Spanish 8 real coins ("Spanish dollars") were overstruck to produce 960 real coins. Copper 80 réis were introduced in 1811.

Between 1823 and 1833, the copper coinage of Brazil varied across the country, with denominations of 10, 20, 40, 75 and 80 réis being produced. Silver coins continued in denominations of 80, 160, 320, 640 and 960 réis, along with gold 4,000 and 6,400 réis.

Between 1833 and 1835, the coinage was reformed. The copper coinage was standardized across the country, with the introduction of countermarked coins for 10, 20 and 40 réis. Silver coins were introduced in denominations of 100, 200, 400, 800 and 1,200 réis, along with gold 10,000 réis.

A further reform between 1848 and 1854 reduced the silver and gold content of the coinage, with new silver coins for 200, 500, 1,000 and 2,000 réis, and gold 5,000, 10,000 and 20,000 réis. Bronze 10 and 20 réis were introduced in 1868, followed by cupro-nickel 100 and 200 réis in 1871, bronze 40 réis in 1873 and cupro-nickel 50 réis in 1886. The 10 réis was discontinued in 1870.

In 1901, cupro-nickel 400 réis were introduced, followed by cupro-nickel 20 réis in 1918. Aluminium-bronze 500 and 1000 réis were introduced in 1922, followed by cupro-nickel 200 réis, aluminium-bronze 2,000 réis and silver 5,000 réis in 1936.

Banknotes 
Various denominations were issued with the value written on at the time of issue. They circulated at face value and were convertible into coins.

The first  was founded in 1808 and began issuing notes in 1810, in denominations of 30, 40, 50, 60, 70, 80, 90, 100, 200, 300 and 400 mil réis, with 4, 6, 8, 10, 12 and 20 mil réis added in 1813 and 1 and 2 mil réis in 1828. This bank closed in 1829.

In 1833, the government issued copper exchange notes in denominations of 1, 2, 5, 10, 20, 50 and 100 mil réis. These were followed, in 1835, by Treasury notes in denominations of 1, 2, 5, 10, 20, 50, 100, 200 and 500 mil réis. 500 mil réis notes were added in 1874, with 1,000 mil réis introduced in 1921. Treasury notes continued to be produced throughout the remaining period the real circulated and the final issues were overstamped to produce the first cruzeiro notes.

Between 1850 and 1893, a number of private banks issued paper money in denominations between 10 and 500 mil réis.

Regional governments issued paper money between 1892 and 1897. Denominations included 100, 200 and 500 réis and 1, 2, 5, 10, 50, 100, 200 and 500 mil réis, with issues from Alagoas, Amazonas, Maranhão, Pernambuco, Rio Grande do Norte and Sergipe.

Between 1906 and 1910, the  issued notes in denominations of 10, 20, 50, 100, 200, 500 and 1,000 mil réis (1 conto de réis). In 1905, another Banco do Brazil was founded, which issued paper money between 1923 and 1942 in denominations of 1, 2, 5, 10, 20, 50, 100, 200, 500 and 1,000 mil réis. In 1926, the  issued gold notes in denominations of 10, 20, 50, 100, 200, 500 and 1,000 mil réis.

Regional governments again issued paper money between 1924 and 1942. Denominations included 2, 5, 10, 20, 50, 100, 200 and 500 mil réis, with issues from Minas Gerais, Rio Grande do Sul and São Paulo. The last "réis" banknotes were replaced by cruzeiro banknotes and withdrawn in 1955.

See also

Economy of the Empire of Brazil
Brazilian currency

References

External links
 Coins of Brazil with Pictures
 Images of historic and modern Brazilian bank notes

real
Currency symbols
1942 disestablishments in Brazil